Cyclamen graecum, the Greek cyclamen, is a perennial plant in the flowering plant family Primulaceae that grows from a tuber. It is native to southern Greece, southern Turkey and neighboring islands and is prized for its variable leaf forms, which include some of the most striking of any cyclamen.

Distribution
Cyclamen graecum is native to a wide variety of areas up to  elevation in southern mainland Greece, the Peloponnese, Aegean Islands, Crete, the southern coast of Turkey, and northern Cyprus.

Description

The tuber is corky, with a thick, strong, fleshy anchor, and roots sprouting from the center of the bottom.

The leaves are heart-shaped and toothed.

The flowers bloom in autumn, with five petals which are white or pink with a darker blotch at the nose. They are often fragrant. The bases of the petals are curled outwards into auricles. After pollination, the flower stem coils in both directions, starting from the center, not from the top as in Cyclamen hederifolium.

Subdivisions

Subspecies
Cyclamen graecum has three subspecies, distinguished by flower characteristics:
Cyclamen graecum subsp. graecum — pink flowers with a darker blotch at the nose (Greece, Aegean islands, Crete)
Cyclamen graecum subsp. graecum f. album — all-white flowers (Peloponnese, Rhodopou Peninsula of Crete)
Cyclamen graecum subsp. anatolicum Ietsw. — more slender flowers with a smaller blotch and slight auricles (southern Turkey, Rhodes, northern Cyprus). Now elevated to a separate species, Cyclamen maritimum.
Cyclamen graecum subsp. mindleri Hildebr. (or candicum Ietsw.) white or pale pink flowers with more pronounced auricles (western Crete)

References

External links

Cyclamen Society
Cyclamen graecum (Monthly feature article);
photos of tuber (Bulb Log 31, 30 July 2008) — Scottish Rock Garden Club
Pacific Bulb Society
photos — Flickr search
IPNI Listing
Gallery of the World's Bulbs — International Bulb Society (photo of tuber)
Kew Plant List

graecum
Flora of Greece
Flora of Turkey